Aung Soe Myint is a Burmese politician and political prisoner, previously served as a Pyithu Hluttaw MP for Taungoo Township. He was elected as an Pyithu Hluttaw MP in the 1990 Burmese general election, winning a 68% majority (21,369 votes), but was never allowed to assume his seat.

Aung Soe Myint graduated from the Rangoon Institute of Economics in 1975. He became involved in politics during the 8888 Uprising, serving as a member of the Central General Strike Committee of the Taungoo District People’s Liberation Alliance.

From 31 August 2003 to 23 September 2008, he served a stint at Thayet prison, for purportedly possessing a motorcycle without a license. In fact, he had organized events for the 15th anniversary of the 8888 Uprising. He was released in September 2008, as part of a government amnesty involving the release of 9,002 prisoners.

References

Members of Pyithu Hluttaw
National League for Democracy politicians
Prisoners and detainees of Myanmar
1952 births
Living people
People from Bago Region